Toyota– Pro Cycling Team was a continental professional bicycle racing team founded in 2005 by former Olympic cyclist Sean Tucker. The team was based in the  States and participated in UCI Continental Circuits races, mainly in the UCI America Tour, as well as many other races in North America. Toyota– was the only domestic team to have won a stage in Tour of California and Tour de Georgia in 2006 and 2007. The team finished second in the National Race Calendar standings for the second consecutive season.

The team has folded and no longer exists.

Squad

Notable riders
 Antonio Cruz (2006)
 Juan José Haedo (2006)

References

External links

 VELOBIOS Team Profile

UCI Continental Teams (America)
Cycling teams established in 2006
Cycling teams disestablished in 2008